The Belfries of Belgium and France are a group of 56 historical buildings designated by UNESCO as a World Heritage Site, in recognition of the civic (rather than church) belfries serving as an architectural manifestation of emerging civic independence from feudal and religious influences in the former County of Flanders (present-day French Flanders area of France and Flanders region of Belgium) and neighbouring areas which once were possessions of the House of Burgundy (in present-day Wallonia of Belgium).

The World Heritage Site was originally called the Belfries of Flanders and Wallonia, a 1999 UNESCO list of 32 towers in those two regions of Belgium. In 2005, the list was expanded and given its current name, recognizing the addition of 23 belfries from the Nord-Pas-de-Calais and Picardy regions in the north-eastern tip of France, plus the belfry of Gembloux in Wallonia. 

Despite the list being concerned with civic tower structures, it includes six Belgian church towers (note the "cathedral"s, "church"es and "basilica" in the list below) under the pretext that they had served as watchtowers or alarm bell towers.

Most of the structures in this list are towers projecting from larger buildings. However, a few are notably standalone, of which, a handful are rebuilt towers formerly connected to adjacent buildings. One notable omission may seem the tower of Brussels' Town Hall, but this is not an actual belfry. The original Belfry of Brussels was located next to the Church of St. Nicholas, until its collapse in 1714. As a side note, Brussels' Town Hall is part of the Grand-Place World Heritage Site.

List of belfries

See also
 List of World Heritage Sites in Belgium
 List of World Heritage Sites in France

Notes

References

External links

 Brief description of the ensemble ID 943/943bis, UNESCO Website

 Detailed argumentation for list ID 943/943bis, UNESCO Website

 The complete list ID 943/943bis, UNESCO Website (monuments ordered by UNESCO ID, which precedes the corresponding monument in this Wikipedia article's main list)
 Articles on the phenomenon of the belfries from the Flemish Department of Monuments and Landscapes
 The Belgian belfries on the UNESCO list ID 943 (without Gembloux) with photographs  and slideshows – from the Flemish Department of Monuments and Landscapes
  The French belfries on the UNESCO list ID 943bis with photographs  and descriptions; and a general article
  The French belfries on the UNESCO list ID 943bis with thumbnails, photographs and descriptions

World Heritage Sites in Belgium
World Heritage Sites in France
 
Bell towers
Towers in France
Lists of buildings and structures in France
Lists of buildings and structures in Belgium
Picardy
Renaissance architecture in Belgium
Renaissance architecture in France